This is a season-by-season list of records compiled by Vermont in men's ice hockey.

The University of Vermont has reached the Frozen Four twice in its history.

Season-by-season results

Note: GP = Games played, W = Wins, L = Losses, T = Ties

* Winning percentage is used when conference schedules are unbalanced.† The remainder of Vermont's season was cancelled after reports of a hazing scandal became public.

Footnotes

References

 
Lists of college men's ice hockey seasons in the United States
Vermont sports-related lists